The Amelia Island Concours d'Elegance is an automotive charitable event held each year during the second weekend in March at The Ritz-Carlton Amelia Island in Amelia Island, Florida. A New York Times article about celebrity car ownership listed "the nation's top concours d'elegance: Pebble Beach in California, Meadow Brook in Michigan, Amelia Island in Florida and the Louis Vuitton Classic in midtown Manhattan."

A  (French, literally "a competition of elegance") is according to The New York Times writer Keith Martin like a "beauty pageant for rare and elegant cars". Each entry is rated for authenticity, function, history, style and quality of restoration by a team of judges that includes specialists for each car type. A perfect score is 100, but any imperfection, no matter how slight, requires a fractional point deduction. Classes are arranged by type, marque, coachbuilder, country of origin, or time period.

Judges select first-, second-, and third-place finishers for each class in the event, and the judges confer the best of show award on one car from the group of first-place winners. In addition, a group of honorary judges—typically individuals who have made significant contributions to the automotive industry or motorsports—give subjective awards to recognize standout vehicles regardless of class ribbons, as well as memorial awards created to honor automotive industry personages.

History
Businessman and car collector Bill Warner, a photographer and writer for Road & Track magazine since 1971, founded the Amelia Island Concours d'Elegance in 1996 at the urging of other northeast Florida auto enthusiasts who wanted a classic car show in Florida like the Pebble Beach Concours d'Elegance in California. Warner selected Community Hospice of Northeast Florida, which had provided service to his parents as well as his wife, as the beneficiary of the event. The first event was held April 6, 1996, at Ritz-Carlton Amelia Island. Warner assembled a group of 163 cars and attendance was around 2,200.

By 1999 attendance had increased to 8,500; 205 cars were exhibited; and $268,000 was raised for Community Hospice. The New York Times assigned a reporter to write a story. In his full-page feature article, Keith Martin stated, "The Amelia Island event, which is sponsored by Mercedes-Benz, is the only one in its region to aspire to the same standard of excellence (as the) Concours d'Elegance at Pebble Beach, in California, as well as the Louis Vuitton Classic at Rockefeller Center".

This event was moved from March to May in 2021, and is scheduled to return to March the next year. Also in 2021, the event was bought by Hagerty.

Events
Each year's Amelia Island Concours honors an outstanding person from motorsports, a featured marque (manufacturer) and/or theme, plus judging and awards for each class of the Field of Dreams, the showcase exhibition. Events have included a golf tournament, automobile auctions, art and fashion shows, dinners with honored guests, silent auctions of memorabilia, charity raffles and autograph sessions. The top concours awards are the Best of Show Concours d'Elegance and the Best of Show Concours de Sport. Additionally, there are various corporate awards, vehicle class awards, and special awards such as the People's Choice award.

Entrants submit an application for each car, and the Concours field is selected from each year's pool of applicants. Vehicles newer than 1974 models are normally not eligible to enter, and vehicle participation is by invitation only. Many collectors spend years and hundreds of thousands of dollars purchasing and restoring a car in hopes of being chosen. Once a car is accepted to the Concours, it cannot again be entered in the event for five years, with three exceptions; the ownership of the car has changed, the car has been restored, or if the featured marque is obscure, the Concours car selection committee can reach out to invite cars of varying restoration quality—or cars that have previously been entered in the Concours—in order to provide a healthy representation of the marque for exhibition.	

Most of the owners display their cars because they want everyone who appreciates style and beauty to see their project. Most view the weekend as a social gathering rather than a special interest event. The organizers attempt to invite vehicles from varying time periods so that spectators who prefer a certain style of car will always find several examples to examine. Many of the competing cars are valued in the hundreds of thousands of dollars, with some worth millions. For this reason, along with its setting and amenities, the Amelia Island Concours is considered one of the premier concours in the world.

{| class="wikitable collapsible autocollapse sortable" width=700px
|+Show summaries
|-
! Year
! Honoree
! Marque/theme
! Attendance
! Best in Show Concours d'Elegance
! Best in Show Concours de Sport
|-
|2019
|Jacky Ickx
|Coachbuilt Volkswagens, Dragsters and Funny Cars, Porsche 962 race cars, Jaguar XK120s, Head of State Cars, Ferrari 250 GT SWB, and Cars of Rock Stars
|
|1938 Mercedes-Benz 540K Autobahn-Kurier
|1957 Ferrari 335 S
|-
|2018
|Emerson Fittipaldi	
|Cars of Martini Racing; Cars of ‘Big Daddy’ Ed Roth; the 50th anniversary of the Ferrari Daytona; IMSA Grand Touring Prototypes; Jaguar E-Type; the 70th anniversary of N.A.R.T; Pre-War MGs
|
|1929 Duesenberg J/SJ convertible
|1963 Ferrari 250/275P 
|-
|2017
|Al Unser Jr.	
|Jaguar D-Type; Chevrolet Camaro, Mercedes-Benz Gullwings The Cars of the Movies
|
|1935 Duesenberg SJ 582
|1939 Alfa Romeo 8C 2900 Lungo Spider
|-
|2016
|Hans-Joachim Stuck
|Trophy Cars
|
|1930 Rolls-Royce Phantom II Town Car
|1952 Pegaso Z-102 BS 2.5 Cupula Coupe
|-
|2015
|Stirling Moss	
|Stutz, Cars of the Cowboys, Speedsters, Orphan Concepts, Horseless Carriages, Forgotten Fiberglass
|32,000 
|1930 Cord L-29 Speedster
|1932 Alfa Romeo 8C 2300 Zagato Spider	
|-
|2014	
|Jochen Mass	
|Offenhauser-powered cars; American Underslung; Selections from Zagato	
|29,000
|1937 Horch 853
|1958 Scarab Mark II Sport Racer	
|-
|2013	
|Sam Posey
|Porsche 911, Corvette Sting Ray, Ford GT40, Cars of Harry Miller, Ducati Motorcycles
|25,000
|1936 Duesenberg SJN
|1968 Ford GT40
|-
|2012
|Vic Elford	
|Ferrari GTO; Shelby Cobra; Custom Coachwork Cadillacs	
|23,000
|1962 Ferrari 330 LM
|1938 Bugatti Type 57	
|-
|2011	
|Bobby Rahal	
|Duesenberg; Allard; Kurtis 	
|15,000
|1933 Duesenberg SJN Arlington Torpedo Sedan
|1935 Duesenberg SJ Speedster (Mormon Meteor)
|-
|2010
|Richard Petty	
|40th anniversary of Porsche's inaugural victory at the 24 Hours of Daytona & Le Mans; the last Cuban Grand Prix	
|18,000
|1937 Mercedes-Benz 540K Special Roadster
|1960 Maserati Tipo 61	
|-
|2009	
|David Hobbs	
|Bohman & Schwartz 	
|15,000
|1931 Voisin C20 Demi-Berline
|1923 Miller Special 122 Supercharged	
|-
|2008	
|Parnelli Jones	
|100th Anniversary of GM, Model T, New York-to-Paris "Great Race" of 1908 	
|20,000	
|1935 Duesenberg J Roadster
|1957 Ferrari 335 Sport
|-
|2007	
|Derek Bell	
|Discontinued road races: Mille Miglia, Targa Florio, Carrera Panamericana, Isle of Man TT motorcycle race
|18,000	
|1937 Talbot-Lago T-150 CSS
|1953 Ferrari 375 MM
|-
|2006	
|Johnny Rutherford 	
|Stanley Steamer
|18,000	
|1931 DuPont Model H Sport Phaeton
|1961 Ferrari 250 TRI/61
|-
|2005	
|Bobby Allison	
|Alfa Romeo & 50th Anniversaryof Chevy small block V8
|18,000	
|1931 Bugatti Type 51 Dubos
|1953 Porsche 550 Coupe
|-
|2004	
|Bobby Unser	
|100th Anniversary of Rolls-Royce
|18,000	
|1934 Voisin C-15
|Award did not exist until 2005.
|-
|2003	
|Jim Hall	
|50th Anniversary of Corvette and100th Anniversary of Buick	
|Rain	
|1958 Dual-Ghia Chrysler-powered
|
|-
|2002	
|Dan Gurney	
|100th Anniversary of Cadillac
|14,000	
|1937 Delage D8 120SS Aerodynamic Coupe
|
|-
|2001	
|John Surtees	
|100th Anniversary of Pierce-Arrow	
|11,000	
|1937 Hispano Suiza Dubonnet
|
|-
|2000	
|Brian Redman	
|Mercer
|8,500	
|1938 Alfa Romeo 8C 2900
|
|-
|1999	
|Carroll Shelby	
|100th Anniversary of Packard
|7,200	
|1938 Delage D8 120
|
|-
|1998	
|Hurley Haywood 	
|50th Anniversary of Porsche
|6,500	
|1932 Lincoln KB Dual Cowl Phaeton
|
|-
|1997	
|Phil Hill	
|50th Anniversary of Ferrari	
|3,500	
|1937 Mercedes-Benz 540K Special Roadster
|
|-
|1996	
|Sir Stirling Moss	
|Mercedes-Benz
|2,200	
|1938 Talbot-Lago 150SS Figoni & Falaschi
|
|-
|}

Charitable contributions
The non-profit Amelia Island Concours d'Elegance Foundation was formed in 2000 to organize and manage the workload of more than 300 volunteers.
The proceeds of the Amelia Island Concours d'Elegance have helped support Community Hospice of Northeast Florida with total contributions of over $1.5 million through 2008. The event's goal is to raise at least $100,000 for Community Hospice each year. Other charities receiving funding include The Spina Bifida Association of Florida at Jacksonville, Shop with Cops, Duval County 4-H Foundation and the Navy Marine Corps Relief Society. The concours' foundation has donated over $3.5 million since 1996 to these charitable organizations.

See also
 Concours d'Elegance

References

External links
The Amelia Island Concours d'Elegance website

Concours d'Elegance
1996 establishments in Florida
Culture of Jacksonville, Florida
Auto shows in the United States
Charity events in the United States
Tourist attractions in Duval County, Florida
Recurring events established in 1996
Annual events in Florida
Amelia Island